Sluda is a rural locality (a village) in Zelentsovskoye Rural Settlement, Nikolsky District, Vologda Oblast, Russia. The population was 81 as of 2002.

Geography 
Sluda is located 56 km northwest of Nikolsk (the district's administrative centre) by road. Zelentsovo is the nearest rural locality.

References 

Rural localities in Nikolsky District, Vologda Oblast